Charles Wycliffe Noble OBE FRIBA FRSA (12 June 1925 – 1 April 2017) was a Scottish musician and architect known for his work with the Joystrings and in making public buildings accessible to disabled people. 
The buildings Wycliffe Noble worked on to make them usable for disabled people include the famous Royal Albert Hall, UK Parliament, and Westminster.

References

External links 
https://wycliffenoble.com/
http://www.joystrings.co.uk/Wherearetheynow.html

1925 births
2017 deaths
People from Greenock
20th-century Scottish architects
20th-century Scottish musicians
Fellows of the Royal Institute of British Architects
Officers of the Order of the British Empire
British disability rights activists